The Valdoltra Orthopedic Hospital is one of Slovenia's most important treatment facilities. It is located in Ankaran on the coast of the Adriatic Sea in southwestern Slovenia. Its beginnings go back to 1909, when it began receiving patients with skeletal tuberculosis.

References 

Hospitals in Slovenia
Municipality of Ankaran
Valdoltra
Organizations established in 1909
Hospitals in the Slovene Littoral